Leo Smith is a hurler from Portumna in County Galway, Ireland but plays with the Westmeath senior team, with whom he won Christy Ring Cup tiles in 2005 and 2007. With Portumna he has won Galway Senior Hurling Championships in 2005, 2007, 2008 and 2009, 2013Connacht Senior Club Hurling Championships in 2005 & 2007 and All-Ireland Senior Club Hurling Championships in 2006, 2007, 2009 and 2013. Smith qualifies to play for the Lake County through his work as a teacher in Athlone. Now teaching Ag science, biology, and chemistry in his native Portumna.

Honours

Portumna
All-Ireland Senior Club Hurling Championship:
Winner (4): 2006, 2008, 2009, 2014
Runner-up (1): 2010
Connacht Senior Club Hurling Championship:
Winner (3):2003,  2005, 2007
Galway Senior Hurling Championship:
Winner (6): 2003, 2005, 2007, 2008, 2009, 2013
Runner-up (2): 2004, 2006

Westmeath
 Christy Ring Cup:Winner (3): 2005, 2007, 2010
Runner-Up (1): 2008
National Hurling League Div 2:
Winner (1): 2008
Kehoe Cup:
Winner (3): 2008 2009 2010

References
 http://www.hoganstand.com/westmeath/ArticleForm.aspx?ID=95235

Living people
Portumna hurlers
Westmeath inter-county hurlers
Year of birth missing (living people)